Færgekroen is a 1956 Danish film directed by Poul Bang and starring Dirch Passer.

Cast
 Dirch Passer - Erik Hansen
 Ove Sprogøe - Lars Tofte
 Kjeld Petersen - Jens Ravn
 Lily Broberg - Kamilla
 Poul Müller - Niels Ermandsen
 Else Kornerup - Ebba Ermandsen
 Mimi Heinrich - Susanne Ermandsen
 Henrik Wiehe - Johan Ranggaard
 Buster Larsen - P. Andersen
 Caja Heimann - Michelsen
 Anna Henriques-Nielsen - Christiansen
 Inge Ketti - Marie
 Henry Nielsen - Postbudet
 Carl Johan Hviid - Dyrlægen
 Jørn Grauengaard - Orkesterdirigent
 Inge Østergaard - Refrænsangerinde
 Miskow Makwarth - Auktionarius
 Juditha Barbano - Syngende krogæst (uncredited)

External links

1956 films
1950s Danish-language films
Danish black-and-white films
Films directed by Poul Bang
Films scored by Sven Gyldmark
Danish comedy films
1956 comedy films